Nathan Freeman (born 16 June 1995) is an Australian rules footballer who played for the St Kilda Football Club in the Australian Football League. He was drafted by Collingwood at pick 10 in the 2013 AFL national draft. He was then traded to the Saints in 2015 without having played an AFL game due to repeated injuries. Freeman was delisted at the end of the 2018 season having made his long-awaited senior debut only weeks earlier against the Western Bulldogs in Round 20. Freeman is currently playing for the SANFL Crows in the South Australian Football League. Freeman previously played for the Frankston Football Club in the Victorian Football League.

References

External links

 

Living people
1995 births
St Kilda Football Club players
Sandringham Dragons players
Sandringham Football Club players
Frankston Football Club players
Australian rules footballers from Victoria (Australia)
People educated at Haileybury (Melbourne)